Kapellen-Drusweiler is a municipality in Südliche Weinstraße district, in Rhineland-Palatinate, western Germany.

Geography 
The wine village of Kapellen-Drusweiler is a linear village, between the Palatinate Forest and the Rhine. The parish of Kapellen-Drusweiler includes the villages of Deutschhof, Eichenhöfe und Kaplaneihof.  Deutschhof was founded by Swiss immigrants.

History 
Drusweiler was first mentioned in 1179. Around 1200, Klingenmünster Abbey build a chapel opposite the Church in Drusweiler. Around it there developed an independent settlement called Kapellen. The Duke of Palatinate-Zweibrücken united the two communities in 1410.

Religion 
In 2007 52 percent of the inhabitants were Protestant and 24,8 percent Catholic. The remainder belong to other religions or were unaffiliated with any religion.

Politics

Municipal council 
The municipal council in Kapellen-Drusweiler comprises twelve councilors, elected by proportional representation local elections on 7 June 2009, together with the voluntary position of Mayor.

Distribution of seats in municipal elections:

Coat of Arms 
The blazon of the coat of arms reads: "Von Schwarz und Gold gespalten, rechts eine goldene Pflugschar, links ein schwarzes Sesel" (Divided into black and gold, a golden ploughshare right, a black winemakers' knife left).

It was approved in 1981 by the Neustadt district government and goes back to a seal dating from 1744.

References

Municipalities in Rhineland-Palatinate
Südliche Weinstraße